Arsan Pengbanrai (born 31 July 1985) is a Thai professional footballer who plays as a centre back for Phrae United in Thai League 2.

External links

 

1985 births
Living people
Arsan Pengbanrai
Arsan Pengbanrai
Association football central defenders
Arsan Pengbanrai
Arsan Pengbanrai
Arsan Pengbanrai
Arsan Pengbanrai